Velai is a 1998 Indian Tamil-language film, directed by J. Suresh and written by Balakumaran, starring Vignesh, Indraja and Nassar. It was released on 26 February 1998.

Cast

 Vignesh as Ganesh
 Indraja
 Nassar
 Hemanth
 Lathif
 Vadivukkarasi
 Balu Anand
 Charle
 Charuhasan
 Raghavi
 Chokkalinga Bhagavathar
 Major Sundarrajan
 Ponvannan
 Santhana Bharathi
 Thalaivasal Vijay

Soundtrack

The soundtrack was composed by Yuvan Shankar Raja, his second venture after his debut film Aravindhan. It comprises 5 tracks, with Arivumathi, Pazhani Bharathi, Ravi Bharathi and R. V. Udayakumar having written the lyrics for each one song. Popular Tamil actor Vijay had sung one of the songs along with Premji Amaran, though he didn't act in the film, lending his voice to Vignesh while Nassar who acted in this film was introduced as playback singer.

References

External links
 
 employment exchange online registration
 Velai at CineSouth
 Velai songs at Raaga

1998 films
1990s Tamil-language films